Until 1 January 2007, Brande municipality was a municipality (Danish, kommune) in Ringkøbing  on the Jutland peninsula in west Denmark.  The municipality covered an area of 188 km2, and had a total population of 8,822 (2005). Its last mayor was Preben Christensen. The main town and the site of its municipal council was the town of Brande.

Brande municipality ceased to exist as the result of Kommunalreformen ("The Municipality Reform" of 2007). It was merged with Ikast and Nørre-Snede municipalities to form the new Ikast-Brande municipality.  This created a municipality with an area of 768 km2 and a total population of 39,371 (2005). The new municipality belongs to the Region Midtjylland ("Mid-Jutland Region").

External links 
 The new Ikast-Brande municipality's official website (Danish only)
 Brande tourist bureau

References 
 Municipal statistics: NetBorger Kommunefakta, delivered from KMD aka Kommunedata (Municipal Data)
 Municipal mergers and neighbors: Eniro new municipalities map

Former municipalities of Denmark